Glaphyroptera insignis is a fossil species of beetles in the family Buprestidae, the only species in the genus Glaphyroptera.

References

Monotypic Buprestidae genera